Feldmoos-Chli-Titlis Aerial Tramway was an aerial tramway in Switzerland. It was built in 1979 by the Swiss company Habegger between Feldmoos and Chli Titlis for the erection of a communication facility on Chli Titlis. The aerial tramway was used for transporting goods with a weight up to 3.8 tons also for transporting up to 20 people. It used only a single vehicle. After completion of the facility the aerial tramway, which remained property of Habegger, was dismantled in 1986.

The aerial tramway had five towers and a total diagonal length of 4675 metres. The support rope was installed on four towers. The top tower was only used for the return rope, in order to avoid its collision with the suspension ropes. For this span field special markings were required: every , there was a red coil and every  an aircraft warning light. For their power supply a wind generator buffered by accumulators was used, which made technical problems at the beginning.

The drive was done by a DC engine with 301 kW in the valley station.

Technical data 

 Elevation Valley Station: 
 Elevation Mountain Station: 
 Horizontal Length: 
 Height difference: 
 Effective diagonal length: 
 Average inclination: 33%
 Maximum inclination: 80.5%
 Number Towers: 5 (1 for back rope)
 Maximum Tower height: 
 Largest spanfield: 
 Maximum speed: 
 Diameter suspension rope: 2x 
 Diameter pushing rope: 
 Drive: DC engine, 301 kW (max 515 kW)

Sources 
 page 20 page other

 http://www.alpinforum.com/forum/viewtopic.php?f=39&t=15252&p=249754&hilit=Spannweite#p249754

Cable cars in Switzerland
1979 establishments in Switzerland